C. J. Hopkins is an American playwright, novelist, and political satirist. Among his works are the plays Horse Country, screwmachine/eyecandy and The Extremists.

Career

Early works
Hopkins was a 1994 Drama League of New York Developing Artist Fellow and a 1995 Resident Artist/Jerome Foundation Fellow at Mabou Mines/Suite.

Horse Country
His 1992 play, Horse Country, had its UK premiere at the 2002 Edinburgh Festival Fringe. Lyn Gardner in The Guardian wrote: "Hopkins's two-hander brings the spirit of Godot to America's bars and puts the bourbon in Beckett. It feels like a serious piece of theatre rather than fringe fluff." It won a Scotsman Fringe First for New Writing and the 2002 Scotsman Best of the Fringe Firsts Award, and later won the 2004 Best of The Adelaide Fringe Award. Following its London premiere at Riverside Studios, Horse Country toured the UK, Australia, Canada and the Netherlands.

Later works
Hopkins' play screwmachine/eyecandy was copyrighted in 1994, but updated when it was performed a decade later. A production ran during the 2005 Edinburgh Festival Fringe at the Assembly Rooms when The Scotsman described it as a "dark and twisted comedy" about the American game show in which "the excesses of American culture are held up to the light, roundly lampooned and shown to be the poisonous, culturally carcinogenic threats that they really are." It received a Scotsman Fringe First Award for New Writing. The US production was presented at 59E59 Theaters in New York in 2006. Mark Blankenship wrote in his review for Variety: "Although he apes the themes of everything from 1984 to Series 7, a film about a murderous reality show, Hopkins delivers his dogmatism with heavy-handed arrogance." A production was presented at the PushPush theater in Decatur, Georgia in 2008, and it was performed at the San Francisco Fringe Festival in 2017.

Also in 2006, Hopkins' commission by the Free University of Berlin to write and direct a site-specific work, The Insurgency, was staged in German at the university's Philological Library.

His 2009 play The Extremists, commissioned by 7 Stages and directed by Walter D. Asmus, premiered in Berlin and Atlanta in 2010.

Bibliography

Plays 
 Horse Country, Bloomsbury Publishing,  (2004)
 screwmachine/eyecandy, Broadway Play Publishing Inc.,  (2007)
 The Extremists, Broadway Play Publishing Inc.,  (2010)
 The Insurgency, Bordercrossing Berlin, Verlagshaus J. Frank (2006)
 cunnilinguistics
 How To Entertain the Rich
 The Installation
 A Place Like This

Essays
 Trumpocalypse: Consent Factory Essays, Vol. I (2016-2017), Consent Factory Publishing (self-published), November 20, 2019 
 The War on Populism Consent Factory Essays Vol. II (2018-2019),  Consent Factory Publishing (self-published), September 21, 2020,

Novels 
 Zone 23, (self published, 2017)

Further reading
Taibbi, Matt, Meet the Censored: C. J. Hopkins, Critic of the "New Normal", TK, Substack, Thursday, May 13, 2021

References

External links 
 

1961 births
Living people
20th-century American dramatists and playwrights
21st-century American dramatists and playwrights
20th-century American male writers
21st-century American male writers
American male dramatists and playwrights
Postmodern theatre
Screenwriting instructors
American male novelists
21st-century American novelists
Writers from Miami
Novelists from Florida